"Twilight" is the second single recorded by Barbados-based pop group Cover Drive. The song was written by the band with Swedish production team Quiz & Larossi and Ina Wroldsen. The song was released on 22 January 2012 as a digital download and CD single in the United Kingdom, taken from their debut album, Bajan Style. The song topped the UK Singles Chart and received a Gold certification from the British Phonographic Industry in October 2020.

Music video
A music video to accompany the release of "Twilight" was first released on YouTube on 25 November 2011 at a total length of three minutes and thirty-five seconds. It reached the impressive mark of 20,030,936 views. The video featured a cameo appearance by Survivor: Nicaragua contestant Brenda Lowe in a laundromat.

Chart performance
On the week ending 4 February 2012, "Twilight" debuted at number-one on the UK Singles Chart with sales of 76,109 copies. The position marked the group's second consecutive top 10 single after "Lick Ya Down" and first number-one single. The song has sold 400,000 copies in the UK as of October 2020.

Track listings

Charts

Weekly charts

Year-end charts

Certifications and sales

Release history

References

2011 songs
2012 debut singles
Cover Drive songs
Polydor Records singles
Song recordings produced by Quiz & Larossi
Songs written by Andreas Romdhane
Songs written by Ina Wroldsen
Songs written by Josef Larossi
UK Singles Chart number-one singles